Melvin Joseph Dalton (March 15, 1906 – October 13, 1983) was an American steeplechase runner. He competed in the men's 3000 metres steeplechase at the 1928 Summer Olympics.

References

External links
 
 Seton Hall University's Athletics Collection

1906 births
1983 deaths
Athletes (track and field) at the 1928 Summer Olympics
American male steeplechase runners
Olympic track and field athletes of the United States
Track and field athletes from Newark, New Jersey